Kosmos 2050 ( meaning Cosmos 2050) is a Soviet US-K missile early warning satellite which was launched in 1989 as part of the Soviet military's Oko programme. The satellite is designed to identify missile launches using optical telescopes and infrared sensors.

Kosmos 2050 was launched from Site 16/2 at Plesetsk Cosmodrome in the Russian SSR. A Molniya-M carrier rocket with a 2BL upper stage was used to perform the launch, which took place at 20:35 UTC on 23 November 1989. The launch successfully placed the satellite into a molniya orbit. It subsequently received its Kosmos designation, and the international designator 1989-091A. The United States Space Command assigned it the Satellite Catalog Number 20330.

See also

List of Kosmos satellites (2001–2250)
List of R-7 launches (1985–1989)
1989 in spaceflight
List of Oko satellites

References

Kosmos satellites
Oko
Spacecraft launched by Molniya-M rockets
1989 in the Soviet Union
Spacecraft launched in 1989